Maria Lúcia da Silva Lima (born 1 April 1964), commonly known as Fia Carioca for distinguishing purposes or simply Fia, is a Brazilian footballer who played as a midfielder for the Brazil women's national football team. She was part of the team at the 1991 FIFA Women's World Cup. At the club level she played for EC Radar in Brazil, as well as Bangu and Vasco da Gama.

References

External links
 

1964 births
Living people
Brazilian women's footballers
Brazil women's international footballers
Place of birth missing (living people)
1991 FIFA Women's World Cup players
Women's association football midfielders
EC Radar players
CR Vasco da Gama (women) players